

Plants

Angiosperms

Archosauromorphs

Phytosaurs

Pseudosuchians

Dinosaurs
Data courtesy of George Olshevsky's dinosaur genera list.

Birds

References

1960s in paleontology
Paleontology 1